Robert Phillip Storch is an American lawyer and government official serving as the inspector general in the United States Department of Defense under Joe Biden. He previously served as the inspector general of the National Security Agency.

Education 
Storch earned a Bachelor of Arts degree from Harvard University in 1982 and a Juris Doctor from Columbia Law School in 1986.

Career 
After law school, he clerked for William Duffy Keller of the Central District of California. From 1995 to 2012, Storch worked in the U.S. Attorney's Office for the Northern District of New York, where he served as deputy criminal chief and counsel to the U.S. attorney. He was a DOJ Resident Legal Advisor in Ukraine from 2007 to 2009. Storch has also served as chief of the Appellate Division and senior litigation counsel, as the District of Columbia's Anti-Terrorism coordinator, at the Public Integrity Section of the United States Department of Justice Criminal Division. He also served as an assistant U.S. attorney in the Middle District of Florida and worked as an associate at Covington & Burling. He was previously the deputy inspector general at the United States Department of Justice, the DOJ Office of the Inspector General Whistleblower Ombudsperson, and chairman of the Council of the Inspectors General on Integrity and Efficiency Whistleblower Ombudsman Working Group.

Storch was nominated by President Obama in November 2016 and in January 2017 to become Inspector General of the National Security Agency and renominated for the position by President Trump on June 19, 2017. The Senate confirmed Storch's nomination on December 21, 2017. He assumed the role on January 2, 2018, and resigned on December 6, 2022.

Storch was nominated by President Biden in November 2021 to become Inspector General of the Department of Defense, a position for which no nominee had received Senate confirmation since 2016. The Senate confirmed the nomination on November 30, 2022, in a 92–3 vote. Storch assumed the role on December 6, 2022.

References

Year of birth missing (living people)
Living people
Place of birth missing (living people)
Harvard College alumni
Columbia Law School alumni
21st-century American lawyers
Trump administration personnel
Biden administration personnel